Jason Evezard (born 17 August 1997) is a South African water polo player. He competed in the 2020 Summer Olympics.

References

1997 births
Living people
Sportspeople from Newport Beach, California
Sportspeople from Port Elizabeth
Water polo players at the 2020 Summer Olympics
South African male water polo players
Olympic water polo players of South Africa